Antonio López Herranz (4 May 1913 – 29 September 1959) was a Spanish professional footballer who played as a striker and a manager.

Playing career
Born in Madrid, López Herranz spent two seasons with local Real Madrid, appearing in only three games in La Liga during his spell and scoring in a 3–3 home draw against Sevilla FC on 8 March 1936 which was his debut. The competition was not held from 1936 to 1939 due to the Spanish Civil War, and he played one year in Mexico with Club América during that hiatus.

López Herranz signed with Hércules CF, also in the Spanish top flight, in 1940. During his only season, in which the Valencian Community club narrowly avoided relegation, he netted braces against Real Murcia (4–0, home) and Sevilla (3–8 away loss).

Coaching career
López Herranz returned to Mexico at the start of World War II, and definitely settled there. He started working with Club León.

López Herranz was head coach of the Mexican national side in two FIFA World Cups, 1954 and 1958. The team only managed to collect one point both tournaments combined, with the subsequent group stage eliminations.

Death
López Herranz died in Los Angeles, United States on 29 September 1959 due to severe respiratory problems which even required the insertion of an artificial lung. He was 46 years old.

Honours

Player

Club
Real Madrid
Copa del Generalísimo: 1936

International
Central American and Caribbean Games: 1938

Manager
León
Liga MX: 1951–52, 1955–56
Copa MX: 1957–58
Campeón de Campeones: 1956

References

External links

1913 births
1959 deaths
Spanish emigrants to Mexico
Naturalized citizens of Mexico
Footballers from Madrid
Spanish footballers
Mexican footballers
Association football forwards
La Liga players
Segunda División players
Real Madrid CF players
Hércules CF players
CE Sabadell FC footballers
Liga MX players
Club América footballers
Competitors at the 1938 Central American and Caribbean Games
Central American and Caribbean Games gold medalists for Mexico
Spanish expatriate footballers
Expatriate footballers in Mexico
Spanish expatriate sportspeople in Mexico
Spanish football managers
Mexican football managers
Liga MX managers
Club León managers
Mexico national football team managers
1954 FIFA World Cup managers
1958 FIFA World Cup managers
Central American and Caribbean Games medalists in football